This list, 2015 in molluscan paleontology, is a list of new taxa of ammonites and other fossil cephalopods, as well as fossil gastropods, bivalves and other molluscs that have been described during the year 2015.

Ammonites

Other cephalopods

Gastropods

Other molluscs

References

2015 in paleontology